The 2014 6 Hours of Shanghai was an endurance sports car racing event held at the Shanghai International Circuit, Shanghai, China on 31 October–2 November 2014, and served as the sixth race of the 2014 FIA World Endurance Championship season. The race was won by Sébastien Buemi and Anthony Davidson driving the No. 8 Toyota TS040 Hybrid car.

Qualifying

Qualifying result
Pole position winners in each class are marked in bold.

Race

Race result
Class winners in bold.

References

 

6 Hours of Shanghai
Shanghai
Shanghai
Shanghai 6hrs
Shanghai 6hrs